The Turkey national handball team is the national handball team of Turkey and is controlled by the Turkey Handball Federation.

IHF Emerging Nations Championship record
2017 – Runner-up

External links
Official website
IHF profile

Men's national handball teams
National team
H